Marco Turati (born 15 May 1982 in Lecco) is an Italian retired footballer who played as a centre back. He is currently a part of the technical staff at Spezia.

Career
On 1 September 2008, he was loaned to Ancona.

Management career
At the end of the 2018–19 season, Turati hang up his boots and joined the technical staff of Spezia Calcio as a technical collaborator.

References

External links

1982 births
Italian footballers
S.S. Chieti Calcio players
Carrarese Calcio players
Hellas Verona F.C. players
A.C. Cesena players
F.C. Grosseto S.S.D. players
A.C. Ancona players
Modena F.C. players
Calcio Lecco 1912 players
Siracusa Calcio players
Serie B players
Serie C players
Serie D players
Association football defenders
Living people
Sportspeople from Lecco
Footballers from Lombardy